The 2011 CONCACAF Champions League Final was the final of the 2010–11 CONCACAF Champions League, and the third final of the current format of the CONCACAF Champions League. The match was contested in a two-leg aggregate format between April 20–27, 2011.

The winners earned the right to represent CONCACAF at the 2011 FIFA Club World Cup, entering at the quarterfinal stage.

Background 

Mexican side Monterrey is the only team in the tournament that remains undefeated with an accumulated record of 8 victories and 2 draws.

American side Real Salt Lake is the first MLS team to reach the final of the tournament since the 2000 edition, where Los Angeles Galaxy was crowned champion.

The 2011 final was the first Champions League final, under its current format, that did not feature an all-Mexican final. Additionally, this is the first time since 2000 that a U.S. team has made the final.

Road to the final

Rules 
Like other match-ups in the knockout round, the teams played two games, one at each team's home stadium. If the teams remained tied after 90 minutes of play during the 2nd leg, the away goals rule would be used, but not after a tie enters extra time, and so a tie would be decided by penalty shootout if the aggregate score is level after extra time.

Final summary

First leg

Second leg

References

External links
 CONCACAF Champions League official website

Finals
2010–11 in Mexican football
2011 in American soccer
C.F. Monterrey matches
Real Salt Lake matches
CONCACAF Champions League Finals
International club association football competitions hosted by Mexico
CONCACAF Champions League finals